Robert George Bouffler (31 January 1874 - c. 1956) was a rugby union player who represented Australia.

Bouffler, a hooker, claimed one international rugby cap for Australia, playing against Great Britain, at Sydney, on 5 August 1899.

References

Australian rugby union players
Australia international rugby union players
1874 births
1956 deaths
Rugby union hookers